Asura mediofascia is a moth of the  family Erebidae. It is found in New Guinea and on Lombok.

References

mediofascia
Moths described in 1913
Taxa named by Walter Rothschild
Moths of New Guinea
Moths of Indonesia